The National Youth Union of Mali (abbreviated U.N.J.M.) was a youth organization in Mali. UNJM was the youth wing of the ruling (and sole legal political party in the country) UDPM. UNJM held its first national council meeting in 1979. Mahamadou Baba Diallo served as the general secretary of UNJM.

UNJM published a monthly magazine called Sukaabé.

References

Youth wings of political parties in Mali
Youth organizations established in the 1970s
1979 establishments in Mali